Anthony Louis (born February 10, 1995) is an American professional ice hockey center who is currently playing with Barys Astana in the Kontinental Hockey League (KHL). He was drafted by the Chicago Blackhawks, 181st overall, in the 2013 NHL Entry Draft.

Playing career
Louis played for Miami University from 2013–2017 until he was signed by the Chicago Blackhawks. During his collegiate career for the Miami RedHawks, Louis set a career highs in his senior season in 2016–17 season, with 14 goals and 39 points in 36 games. He amassed 46 goals and 80 assists in 145 career games across four seasons during his collegiate career.

On March 13, 2017, Louis embarked on his professional career, securing a two-year, entry-level contract with the Chicago Blackhawks. He immediately joined primary AHL affiliate, the Rockford IceHogs, on an amateur try-out deal for the remainder of the season.

As an impending restricted free agent, Louis was not tendered a qualifying offer by the Blackhawks, releasing him as a free agent on June 25, 2019. On August 8, 2019, Louis was signed to a one-year AHL contract with reigning champions, the Charlotte Checkers, affiliate to the Carolina Hurricanes. Louis began the 2019–20 season, registering just 1 goal in 8 games with the Checkers before he was traded to the Texas Stars, affiliate to the Dallas Stars, in exchange for future considerations on November 20, 2019.

After three seasons with the Texas Stars, Louis left as a free agent following the 2021–22 season. On July 15, 2022, his signed his first contract abroad in agreeing to a one-year contract with Kazakhstani club, Barys Nur-Sultan of the KHL.

Career statistics

Regular season and playoffs

International

Awards and honors

References

External links

1995 births
American men's ice hockey centers
Barys Nur-Sultan players
Charlotte Checkers (2010–) players
Chicago Blackhawks draft picks
Living people
Miami RedHawks men's ice hockey players
Rockford IceHogs (AHL) players
Texas Stars players
USA Hockey National Team Development Program players